Milford could refer to:
Milford, Decatur County, Indiana
Milford, Kosciusko County, Indiana
Milford Township, LaGrange County, Indiana
Former name of Green Hill, Indiana

nl:Milford (Indiana)